Susan Combs (born February 26, 1945) is an American politician, having served elected office in Texas and served as the Assistant Secretary of Policy, Management and Budget at the U.S. Department of the Interior as an appointed official under President Donald J. Trump.

On July 10, 2017, U.S. president Donald Trump nominated Combs to be the assistant secretary for policy, management, and budget at the United States Department of the Interior. Earlier in the year, Trump had considered naming Combs to be the secretary of agriculture, a position which went instead to Sonny Perdue, a former governor of Georgia. The administration cited Combs' career in public office and in the private sector as a small business owner with a ranch in the Big Bend section of West Texas as factors in her selection. U.S. Senator John Cornyn said that he will work for Combs' confirmation and called her "always a fierce advocate for rural Texans." Her nomination to be the assistant secretary for policy, management, and budget was approved on a party-line vote in the Senate Energy and Natural Resources Committee. However, the full Senate did not take up her nomination and sent it back to the White House at the end of 2017. In 2018, the Trump administration re-nominated Combs to the same position. More than 70 conservation organizations sent a letter to the Senate opposing her nomination. She was confirmed by the United States Senate with a vote of 57–36 on June 5, 2019. On April 13, 2020, Combs submitted her resignation which went into effect on April 25, 2020.

A Republican, Combs served from 2007 to 2015 as the Texas Comptroller of Public Accounts. Prior to her tenure as comptroller, Combs had served two terms as commissioner of the Texas Department of Agriculture from 1999 to 2007, taking the reins as the first woman elected to that office in 1998. Combs also served two terms in the Texas House of Representatives. On July 10, 2017, Combs was nominated by U.S. president Donald Trump to be the assistant secretary of the interior for policy, management and budget. As a former Texas state comptroller, the Texas legislature gave control of the state's endangered species program from the Department of Parks and Wildlife to Comb's office, which managed state fiscal and tax matters. However, because of the economic impact of certain endangered species designations, the office of comptroller was viewed as necessary to oversee the State's endangered species program. She also worked with the U.S. Fish and Wildlife Service to protect the dunes sagebrush lizard, ensuring that the lizard's habitat was protected while also ensuring the economic value of the oil and gas economy.

Early life and family 
Combs was born in San Antonio. She grew up in a ranching family in West Texas. She runs a cow-calf operation on her family's ranch in Brewster County; the ranch has been in her family since the turn of the 20th century. She lives in Austin with her husband, Joe W. Duran, a computer scientist. She is the mother of three sons. Combs graduated from Vassar College in Poughkeepsie, New York, majoring in French and religion. She worked in international advertising in New York City, in the financial markets on Wall Street, and for the U.S. government before returning to Texas to obtain credentials from the University of Texas Law School at Austin. After graduation from law school, she served as an assistant district attorney in Dallas, Texas.

Political career 
Combs' first electoral outing was for the 47th legislative district, in Travis County. She won the Republican runoff election by seven votes over intraparty challenger Bill Welch. Combs polled 2,279 votes (50.07 percent) to Welch's 2,272 (49.92 percent). The two had led a five-candidate field in the primary. In the general election, Combs handily defeated the Democrat Jimmy Day, 45,355 (65.4 percent) to 23,987 (34.6 percent). Combs served two terms in the Texas House of Representatives from 1993 and 1996, resigning midway in her second term to join the staff of U.S. senator Kay Bailey Hutchison as the lawmaker's state director. She was succeeded by fellow Republican Patty Keel of Austin.

Texas agriculture commissioner

Combs served as the Texas agriculture commissioner from 1999 to 2007, being the first woman to serve in the position. She succeeded Rick Perry as commissioner, who was instead elected as lieutenant governor.

As agriculture commissioner, Combs worked with the Environmental Defense Fund to protect the golden-cheeked warbler. A stronghold for the bird is the Fort Hood Army Base. The golden-cheeked warbler, also known as the gold finch of Texas, is the only bird species with a breeding range confined to Texas. Fort Hood has the largest known population of golden-cheeked warblers. The Army base needed a way to mitigate its impacts on the golden-cheeked warbler. In partnership with Combs and the Texas Department of Agriculture and a coalition of other organizations, Environmental Defense Fund coordinated the development of a market-based credit exchange. It allowed Fort Hood to quickly obtain offsets from nearby landowners to counteract losses from live-fire training activities and troop movement through core habitat areas.

The program, known as the Fort Hood Recovery Credit System, enrolled nearby landowners with warbler habitat on their property in a competitive reverse bidding auction, which worked as follows:

 The required acreage and potential habitat-improving practices were made known to landowners, who were then given an opportunity to send private offers or bids for projects on their land.
 Bids were submitted, specifying the minimum revenues that the bidder would need to receive, the bidder’s willingness to make a contribution, and the length of the contract up to 25 years, with more credits resulting from longer commitments. This is called a reverse auction because the winners in principle would be those who bid least.
 The final ranking of each offer took into account many factors besides cost including habitat quality, term duration and proximity to Fort Hood.

Over a three-year period, there were eight auctions, or bid rounds, conducted – one every three to four months – and there were 21 successful bidders out of a total of 44.

The Recovery Credit System was designed to connect buyers and sellers directly, putting mitigation dollars straight in the hands of participating landowners. Many of the practices that landowners adopted did not inhibit their operations or reduce revenue, so the conservation credit became an additional source of income.

Texas comptroller of public accounts
Combs was elected as Texas comptroller of public accounts to succeed Carole Strayhorn. Combs served as comptroller from 2007 to 2015. In 2010, Combs was unopposed for a second term as comptroller in the Republican primary, and she faced no Democratic opponent in the November 2 general election. Unsuccessful nominees of the Green and Libertarian parties did seek the position. Combs did not seek reelection to a third term as comptroller or any other statewide office in the 2014 elections.

In 2015, Combs endorsed Carly Fiorina for president.

Texas Smart Schools Initiative
After leaving state politics in 2015, Combs launched the Texas Smart Schools Initiative, intended for parents and officials as a data-driven approach to show which public schools and districts are achieving the highest student performance for the lowest cost. The material, arranged on a five-star scale, was made available without charge. It is funded from her leftover campaign contributions. "Public education is one of the largest items in the state budget; so Texans need to know where their dollars are getting the highest return in terms of student performance," Combs said. Also with leftover campaign cash, Combs formed a 501(c)(4) nonprofit called the Anywhere Woman Project, an online platform aiming to help women ask questions and exchange ideas.

Other activities
Combs served on the boards of the Texas and Southwestern Cattle Raisers Association in Fort Worth and the Texas Wildlife Association. She has also served on the boards the Texas Beef Council and the Texas Production Credit Association.

In 2016, Combs launched "HERdacity" a "nonprofit online platform and mobile app" intended to "give women with shared interests and career ambitions a forum to exchange ideas and offer each other support." HERdacity's goal is to help women have the "audacity" to seek their own paths. In addition, she wrote a memoir entitled Texas Tenacity.

As a member of the Texas House of Representatives in the 1990s, Combs championed legislation prohibiting state wildlife officials from gathering endangered species data from private lands without permission, according to the Austin Chronicle. It also sought to restrict the state from sharing endangered species data with the Fish and Wildlife Service...Following her nomination in July, some 70 conservation groups sent a letter to the Senate Energy and Natural Resources Committee urging members to reject her confirmation. They described Combs as someone who “built her career favoring big corporations and special interests over the needs and survival of imperiled species.”

In August 2019, the Women's Suffrage Celebration Commission elevated Combs to Chairwoman. Prior to that, Combs was a Commission member, appointed to that position in December 2018.

Awards 
At the December 2, 2014, meeting of the Texas Interagency Task Force on Economic Growth and Endangered Species, Dr. Benjamin Tuggle presented Susan Combs, Texas Comptroller and Chair of the Task Force, with a plaque in recognition of her efforts to promote conservation in the State of Texas and the Southwest Region. Dr. Tuggle thanked the Comptroller for her dedication and commitment to expanding species research efforts and supporting on the ground conservation efforts in the State of Texas. He praised the Comptroller for her ability to bring together diverse stakeholder groups to tackle difficult conservation issues for a number of species including the dunes sagebrush lizard, the lesser prairie-chicken and the golden-cheeked warbler. Her willingness to work with the Fish and Wildlife Service on challenging issues benefited both the wildlife in Texas as well as the State’s landowners and economy.

References

External links

 
 Profile at The Texas Tribune
 Profile at Project Vote Smart
 Profile at Ballotpedia
 Window on State Government

|-

|-

|-

1945 births
Agriculture commissioners of Texas
Comptrollers of Texas
Living people
Republican Party members of the Texas House of Representatives
People from Austin, Texas
People from Brewster County, Texas
People from San Antonio
Politicians from Dallas
Politicians from New York City
Ranchers from Texas
Texas lawyers
Trump administration personnel
United States Assistant Secretaries of the Interior
University of Texas School of Law alumni
Vassar College alumni
Women state legislators in Texas
21st-century American women